Aberrasine is a genus of Erebid moths, first described by Volynkin and Huang in 2019.

Species 

 Aberrasine aberrans (Butler, 1877)
 Aberrasine atuntseensis (Daniel, 1951)
 Aberrasine collina (Černý, 2016)
 Aberrasine dingjiai (Hsu, M.-Y. Chen & Buchsbaum, 2018)
 Aberrasine inaequidens (de Joannis, 1928)
 Aberrasine expressa (Inoue, 1988)
 Aberrasine nigrociliata (Fang, 1991)
 Aberrasine peraffinis (Fang, 1991)
 Aberrasine separans (de Joannis, 1928)
 Aberrasine shiou (Wu & Kishida, 2020)
 Aberrasine sinuata (Fang, 1991)
 Aberrasine strigivenata (Hampson, 1894)
 Aberrasine variata (Daniel, 1951)

References 

 

Moth genera
Nudariina